Penitentiary Angel (also known as Behind the Wall of Shame, is a 1994 Chinese drama film starring Zhao Wei and directed by Jin Xie. The film was adapted from the same name novel. Official selection of 1995 UN's Women Conference.

Cast
Ding Jinger, played by Zhao Wei
La-La Chiu
Tsui-Wan Lee
Tung Yin Liu
Ching Ping Lo
Ling-Yan Ma

Awards and nominations
Beijing Student Film Festival
 Won: Special Honor Award

References

External links
 
Sina.com

1995 films
1995 drama films
Chinese drama films
Films based on Chinese novels
Films directed by Xie Jin